is a Japanese model.

Appearances

Commercials
 JTA (2008)
 Warner Music Japan - Rip Slyme "Taiyou to Bikini" (2008)
 Shiseido - Integrate (2010-)
 Baskin-Robbins 31 Ice Cream (2010)
 Suzuki - Palette SW (2012)
 Suntory - Stones Bar (2012)
 ASICS - A77 (2012)
 Daiō Seishi - Elis Ultra Guard Gokusui (2013)

TV shows
 Another Sky (NTV, 2008-), presenter (From 5 October 2012 To 26 September 2014)

CD jackets
 Flower - Jacren (19 August 2009)
 Uchinaka Cafe: Relax Time no Cafe Bossa (21 December 2011)

Bibliography

Magazines
 Non-no, Shueisha 1971-, as a regular model
 More, Shueisha 1977-, as a regular model
 Ray (May 2013), Shufunotomo 1988-, cover (23 January 2013)
 ar (July 2011), Shufu to Seikatsusha 1995-, cover (10 June 2011)

Photobooks
 Cecil (Shueisha, December 2012)

Awards
 Elite Model Look Japan 2007 Grand Prix

References

External links
 Official agency profile 
  
  
 

Living people
People from Okinawa Prefecture
1990 births
Japanese female models
Japanese television personalities
Models from Okinawa Prefecture